Blastobasis adustella is a species of moth of the family Blastobasidae. It is endemic to Australian region, but was introduced in western Europe and is now reported from The Netherlands, Great Britain, Ireland, Madeira and the Azores

Description
The wingspan is 15–20 mm. Adults are on wing from August to September.

The larvae feed on a variety of foodstuffs, including decaying vegetable matter as well as the seedheads of wild teasel (Dipsacus fullonum) in Europe.

Taxonomy
The name Blastobasis lignea has often been used for records now considered as Blastobasis adustella. A taxonomic revision by Karsholt & Sinev reclassifies Walsingham's original B. lignea specimen as Blastobasis vittata, making lignea properly the junior synonym of vittata. B. adustella was originally described by Walshingham as a variety of B. lignea.

References

External links
 Azores Bioportal 

Blastobasis
Moths described in 1894
Moths of Australia
Moths of Europe
Taxa named by Thomas de Grey, 6th Baron Walsingham